San Felice del Molise (also called Filić or Štifilić) is a small town and comune in the province of Campobasso in the Molise region of Italy, near the Trigno river.

Like Acquaviva Collecroce and Montemitro, San Felice del Molise is home to a community of Molisian Croats, most of whom speak a particular Croatian dialect (they call it simply naš jezik, 'our language') as well as Italian.

Main sights include the Norman Chapel of S. Felice and the church of Santa Maria di Costantinopoli.

See also
 Molise Croats

International relations

 
San Felice del Molise is twinned with:

  Omiš, Croatia

References

External links
UNESCO Red Book on endangered languages and dialects: Europe

Cities and towns in Molise